The 1947–48 Kansas State Wildcats men's basketball team represented Kansas State University as a member of the Big Seven Conference during the 1947–48 NCAA men's basketball season. The head coach was Jack Gardner, who was in his fifth season at the helm. Playing out of the West region of the NCAA tournament, the Wildcats reached the first Final Four in school history.

The team played its home games at Nichols Hall in Manhattan, Kansas.

Roster

Schedule and results

|-
!colspan=6 style=| Non-conference regular season

|-
!colspan=6 style=| Big Seven Regular Season

|-
!colspan=6 style=| NCAA Tournament

Awards and honors
 Howie Shannon – All-American

References

Kansas State
Kansas State
NCAA Division I men's basketball tournament Final Four seasons
Kansas State Wildcats men's basketball seasons
1948 in sports in Kansas
1947 in sports in Kansas